Michelangelo Minieri (born 29 May 1981) is an Italian footballer who plays defender for S.S. Barletta Calcio.

Career
Minieri started his career at S.S. Lazio youth team. He was loaned to Catania before signed by reformed Florentia Viola (ex-Fiorentina) at Serie C2. He then played for Triestina at Serie B. In January 2006 he was signed by league rival Avellino but failed to avoid relegation. In July 2006, he was signed by Serie A team Ascoli which aim to protect her place in top division. he played his first Serie A match on 24 September 2006 against U.C. Sampdoria. He played 19 times in his first Serie A season, including 13 start. He followed Ascoli relegated to Serie B but only played 5 league appearances. In January 2008 he was transferred to Vicenza along with Giampietro Perrulli and in summer 2008 loaned to Perugia but in January 2009 back to Vicenza without any appearances after.

External links
http://www.figc.it/nazionali/DettaglioConvocato?codiceConvocato=1798&squadra=6
http://aic.football.it/scheda/4605/minieri-michelangelo.htm

Italian footballers
Italy youth international footballers
S.S. Lazio players
Catania S.S.D. players
ACF Fiorentina players
U.S. Triestina Calcio 1918 players
U.S. Avellino 1912 players
Ascoli Calcio 1898 F.C. players
L.R. Vicenza players
A.C. Perugia Calcio players
A.S.D. Barletta 1922 players
Serie A players
Serie B players
Serie C players
Association football defenders
Footballers from Rome
1981 births
Living people